Nancharipet is a village in Nalgonda district in Telangana, India. It falls under Atmakur mandal. It is located 59 KM towards North from district headquarters Nalgonda. Regional Language of Nancharipet is Telugu. Hyderabad, Suryapet &, Jangaon  are some important cities nearby.

References

Villages in Nalgonda district